= Joseph H. Kler =

Joseph H. Kler (1903–1983), was an American physician who founded the infirmary at Rutgers University in 1931 and is best known for his collections of particularly stamps. In the early 1960s, he gave his Rotary Golden Anniversary stamps to the Smithsonian Institution in Washington.
